The discography of Therapy?, a Northern Irish rock band, consists of 14 studio albums, two live albums, five compilation albums (including a box-set), five extended plays, two video albums, 30 singles and 33 music videos. The list does not consist of any material released by band members with any other project, or any release not under the band name.

The band was formed in Larne, County Antrim in 1989 by Andy Cairns, Fyfe Ewing and Michael McKeegan. Following the releases of Babyteeth (1991) and Pleasure Death (1992) on Wiiija Records, Therapy? signed a deal with A&M Records and quickly produced their major label debut Nurse (1992). Its follow-up, Troublegum (1994), reached the top 5 of the UK Album Charts selling a million units worldwide. Ewing left the group following the release of Infernal Love (1995). With the addition of two new members Graham Hopkins and Martin McCarrick, Therapy? released Semi Detached (1998), their final album for A&M Records. Two more albums, Suicide Pact – You First (1999) and Shameless (2001) were released under the Ark21/Universal banner. Neil Cooper replaced Hopkins in 2002. High Anxiety (2003) was released on Spitfire Records, preceding the departure of McCarrick.

Six studio albums have since been released as a three piece – Never Apologise Never Explain (2004), One Cure Fits All (2006), Crooked Timber (2009), A Brief Crack of Light (2012) and Disquiet (2015). A fifteenth album titled Cleave was released in September 2018. Therapy? is currently signed to Marshall Records.

Albums

Studio albums

Live albums

Compilation albums

Extended plays

Singles 

Notes

A. "Gimme Back My Brain" was ineligible for the UK Singles Chart, but peaked at no. 6 on the UK Budget Albums Chart.

Demos

Promo singles 
 "Nausea" (1992) US CD, CS
 "Perversonality" (1993) US CD
 "Screamager" (1993) US CD
 "Knives" (1994) US CD
 "Stay Happy" (1998) UK CD
 "Six Mile Water" (2000) Belgium CD
 "Bad Karma Follows You Around" (2000) CD
 "Rise Up (Make Yourself Well)" (2004) CD-R
 "Die Like a Motherfucker" (2004) CD-R
 "Long Distance" (2005) Belgium CD-R
 "Perish the Thought" (2005)  Belgium CD-R

Miscellaneous releases 

 "Have a Merry Fucking Christmas" (1992) a 7" given away at Dublin & Belfast gigs
 "Live in Japan (Fan Club Edition)" (1994) a fan-club only cassette recorded live in Tokyo in October 1993
 "Official Fan Club 1996" (1996) a fan-club only CD recorded live in Arnhem in July 1995
 "Webgig" (2007) a live studio video/audio download, recorded in September 2006
 "Wood & Wire" (2016) an acoustic CD album recorded for exclusive sale on 'Wood & Wire' tour

Selected video appearances 
 "Video Debacle #8" (1994) A&M Records US VHS promo with a live version of "Knives" filmed in late 1993
 "Harakiri No. 2" (1994) German VHS with live versions of "Trigger Inside" and "Screamager" filmed in Stuttgart in March 1994
 "Welt Turbojugend Tage" (2005) German DVD with live versions of "Meat Abstract", "Teethgrinder" and "Nowhere" filmed in Hamburg in May 2004
 "Westend Festival 2011" (2011) German DVD promo with live versions of "Stop It You're Killing Me" and "Nowhere" filmed in Dortmund in October 2011

Video albums

Music videos

See also 
List of songs recorded by Therapy?

References

External links 
Therapy? band website

Discography
Rock music group discographies

de:Therapy?#Diskografie